Season of Love is a 2019 American romantic comedy film directed by Christin Baker, from a screenplay written by Kathryn Trammell. Featuring an ensemble cast including Dominque Provost-Chalkley, Sandra Mae Frank, Laur Allen, Janelle Marie Rodriguez, Jessica Clark, and Emily Goss, the story follows three female  couples as they fall in love over the holiday season. The film was described as "a Love, Actually for our [queer] community".

The film was produced in-house by Tello Films and released on the company's streaming platform on November 29, 2019.

Plot
The story of a group of diverse women and their connected love lives who discover the meaning of love as they navigate the Christmas holiday season.

Cast 

 Dominique Provost-Chalkley as Sue
 Janelle Marie Rodriguez as Janey
 Jessica Clark as Lou
 Sandra Mae Frank as Kenna
 Emily Goss as Iris
 Laur Allen as Mardou
 Carlin James as Theo
 Matthew Bridges as Charlie
 Lily Richards as Candace

Production 
In response to conversations surrounding the lack of LGBTQ+ representation in holiday films (particularly for queer women), Tello Films announced a "Pitch to Production" contest in November 2018. Winners were selected at the beginning of 2019, and Season of Love entered pre-production soon afterwards. Principal photography began in May 2019 and concluded in June 2019.

Baker chose to focus on joyful themes for the film and after the film's release received messages from viewers who were pleased that it was an LGBT movie that did not focus on hardship and that they could watch with their families.

Release 
Season of Love had a limited theatrical release beginning November 22, 2019, and was released digitally on the Tello Films platform the following week.

Reception 
Critical reception in LGBT media was favorable. Autostraddle said it was "everything you could want from a cheesy holiday movie." Diva praised the film, stating that “It’s rare that a film becomes an instant cult classic, but Season Of Love is an exception to that rule”. GO wrote that it was "full of adorable little rom-com moments."

References 

2019 films
2019 comedy-drama films
2019 LGBT-related films
2010s Christmas films
Female bisexuality in film 
Lesbian-related films